"En stjerne skinner i natt" ("A Star Shines Tonight") is a Christmas song written by Eyvind Skeie and Tore W. Aas. It was originally recorded on the 1992 album Tusen julelys by the Oslo Gospel Choir.

The song has also been recorded in Swedish, as "En stjärna lyser i natt" with lyrics by Lasse Kronér and recorded by Triple & Touch on the album De 3 vise männen, and by Christer Sjögren on the 2010 Christmas album En stjärna lyser i natt, and also by Carola Häggkvist on the 1999 Christmas album Jul i Betlehem, as "En stjärna lyser så klar", with  lyrics by Ingela Forsman.

References 

1992 songs
Carola Häggkvist songs
Christmas songs
Christer Sjögren songs
Norwegian-language songs
Norwegian songs
Triple & Touch songs